Vaksdal Church is a parish church of the Church of Norway in Vaksdal Municipality in Vestland county, Norway. It is located in the village of Vaksdal. It is the church for the Vaksdal parish which is part of the Hardanger og Voss prosti (deanery) in the Diocese of Bjørgvin. The gray, stone church was built in a long church design in 1933 using plans drawn up by the architect Ole Landmark. The church seats about 300 people.

History
Historically, the Vaksdal area was part of the Bruvik Church parish. In 1933, the Vaksdal area was separated to become its own parish, so a new church was built. Ole Landmark was hired to design the building. The new church was consecrated on 7 April 1933.

See also
List of churches in Bjørgvin

References

Vaksdal
Churches in Vestland
Long churches in Norway
Stone churches in Norway
20th-century Church of Norway church buildings
Churches completed in 1933
1933 establishments in Norway